The National Health Service Act 1946 (c 81) came into effect on 5 July 1948 and created the National Health Service in England and Wales thus being the first implementation of the Beveridge model. Though the title 'National Health Service' implies a single health service for the United Kingdom, in reality one NHS was created for England and Wales accountable to the Secretary of State for Health, with a separate NHS created for Scotland accountable to the Secretary of State for Scotland by the passage of the National Health Service (Scotland) Act 1947. Similar health services in Northern Ireland were created by the Northern Ireland Parliament through the Health Services Act (Northern Ireland) 1948.

The whole Act was replaced by the National Health Service Act 1977, which itself is now superseded by the National Health Service Act 2006 and the Health and Social Care Act 2012.

Provisions
According to s 1(1),

The Act provided for the establishment of a Central Health Services Council with 41 members to advise the minister: the presidents of royal colleges, councillors, and representatives of doctors, dentists, nurses midwives and pharmacists.

Hospital services were the responsibility of the minister. Existing voluntary and local authority hospitals were transferred to the NHS. Regional hospital boards were created on the basis that each region could "conveniently be associated with a university having a school of medicine". Under them were hospital management committees, to manage individual hospitals or groups of hospitals, other than teaching hospitals, which retained their boards of governors.

County councils and county boroughs were designated as local health authorities. They were responsible for providing ambulance services, health centres, and for care, including dental care, of expectant and nursing mothers and of children under five. They had responsibility for the supervision of midwives and the provision of health visitors and community nursing. They were also responsible for vaccination of persons against smallpox, and immunisation against diphtheria and other diseases.

Executive councils were established to supervise general medical and dental services, pharmaceutical services and supplementary ophthalmic services. Provision was made for the establishment of local medical committees, local pharmaceutical committees, ophthalmic services committees and local dental committees to represent the practitioners in each area. The Medical Practices Committee was established to regulate general practitioners. The sale of the goodwill in medical practices was prohibited.  The Dental Estimates Board was established

Charges
Most services were to be free, but there were powers to make charges for:
 Medical appliances of a more expensive type than the prescribed type (and repairs to appliances)
 Privately paying patients
 Care of expectant and nursing mothers and of children under five
 Aftercare and domestic help
 Dental and optical appliances of a more expensive type than the prescribed type
 Replacement or repair of any dental or optical appliances if the need arose from lack of care

Mental health
The functions of the Board of Control for Lunacy and Mental Deficiency were transferred to the minister.

Further reading 
Image of the Act on the Parliamentary website

See also
National Insurance Act 1911
History of the National Health Service
National Health Service (Scotland) Act 1947
National Health Service and Community Care Act 1990
National Health Service Act 2006
United Kingdom enterprise law

References
Full text of the Act (HTML version)

United Kingdom Acts of Parliament 1946
NHS legislation
Acts of the Parliament of the United Kingdom concerning England and Wales
Welfare state in the United Kingdom
1946 in England
1946 in Wales